In mathematics, Newick tree format (or Newick notation or New Hampshire tree format) is a way of representing graph-theoretical trees with edge lengths using parentheses and commas.  It was adopted by James Archie, William H. E. Day, Joseph Felsenstein, Wayne Maddison, Christopher Meacham, F. James Rohlf, and David Swofford, at two meetings in 1986, the second of which was at Newick's restaurant in Dover, New Hampshire, US. The adopted format is a generalization of the format developed by Meacham in 1984 for the first tree-drawing programs in Felsenstein's PHYLIP package.

Examples

The following tree:

could be represented in Newick format in several ways 

 (());                               no nodes are named
 (A,B,(C,D));                           leaf nodes are named
 (A,B,(C,D)E)F;                         all nodes are named
 (:0.1,:0.2,(:0.3,:0.4):0.5);           all but root node have a distance to parent
 (:0.1,:0.2,(:0.3,:0.4):0.5):0.0;       all have a distance to parent
 (A:0.1,B:0.2,(C:0.3,D:0.4):0.5);       distances and leaf names (popular)
 (A:0.1,B:0.2,(C:0.3,D:0.4)E:0.5)F;     distances and all names
 ((B:0.2,(C:0.3,D:0.4)E:0.5)F:0.1)A;    a tree rooted on a leaf node (rare)

Newick format is typically used for tools like PHYLIP and is a minimal definition for a phylogenetic tree.

Rooted, unrooted, and binary trees
When an unrooted tree is represented in Newick notation, an arbitrary node is chosen as its root.  Whether rooted or unrooted, typically a tree's representation is rooted on an internal node and it is rare (but legal) to root a tree on a leaf node.  

A rooted binary tree that is rooted on an internal node has exactly two immediate descendant nodes for each internal node.
An unrooted binary tree that is rooted on an arbitrary internal node has exactly three immediate descendant nodes for the root node, and each other internal node has exactly two immediate descendant nodes.
A binary tree rooted from a leaf has at most one immediate descendant node for the root node, and each internal node has exactly two immediate descendant nodes.

Grammar
A grammar for parsing the Newick format (roughly based on ):

The grammar nodes 

 Tree: The full input Newick Format for a single tree
 Subtree: an internal node (and its descendants) or a leaf node
 Leaf: a node with no descendants
 Internal: a node and its one or more descendants
 BranchSet: a set of one or more Branches
 Branch: a tree edge and its descendant subtree.
 Name: the name of a node
 Length: the length of a tree edge.

The grammar rules 
Note, "|" separates alternatives.

 Tree → Subtree ";"
 Subtree → Leaf | Internal
 Leaf → Name
 Internal → "(" BranchSet ")" Name
 BranchSet → Branch | Branch "," BranchSet
 Branch → Subtree Length
 Name → empty | string
 Length → empty | ":" number

Whitespace (spaces, tabs, carriage returns, and linefeeds) within number is prohibited.  Whitespace within string is often prohibited.  Whitespace elsewhere is ignored.  Sometimes the Name string must be of a specified fixed length; otherwise the punctuation characters from the grammar (semicolon, parentheses, comma, and colon) are prohibited.  The Tree → Subtree ";" production is instead the Tree → Branch ";" production in those cases where having the entire tree descended from nowhere is permitted; this captures the replaced production as well because Length can be empty.

Note that when a tree having more than one leaf is rooted from one of its leaves, a representation that is rarely seen in practice, the root leaf is characterized as an Internal node by the above grammar.  Generally, a root node labeled as Internal should be construed as actually internal if and only if it has at least two Branches in its BranchSet.  One can make a grammar that formalizes this distinction by replacing the above Tree production rule with

 Tree → RootLeaf ";" | RootInternal ";"
 RootLeaf → Name | "(" Branch ")" Name
 RootInternal → "(" Branch "," BranchSet ")" Name

The first RootLeaf production is for a tree with exactly one leaf.  The second RootLeaf production is for rooting a tree from one of its two or more leaves.

Notes 
 An unquoted  may not contain blanks, parentheses, square brackets, single_quotes, colons, semicolons, or commas. Underscore characters in unquoted s are converted to blanks.
 A  may also be quoted by enclosing it in single quotes. Single quotes in the original string are represented as two consecutive single quote characters.
 Whitespace may appear anywhere except within an unquoted  or a 
 Comments are enclosed in square brackets. They can appear anywhere newlines are allowed. Some dialects allow nested comments.

Dialects

New Hampshire X format 
The New Hampshire X (NHX) format is an extension to Newick that adds key-value data (gene duplication, etc.) to Newick nodes. This is done by putting the additional data in brackets [&&NHX:key=value:...] in the node labels. The brackets are used because they represent comments in the Nexus file format, so any parser not understanding these additional information will ignore them.

Extended Newick 
While the standard Newick notation is limited to phylogenetic trees, Extended Newick (Perl Bio::PhyloNetwork) can be used to encode explicit phylogenetic networks. In a phylogenetic network, which is a generalization of a phylogenetic tree, a node either represents a divergence event (cladogenesis) or a reticulation event such as hybridization, introgression, horizontal (lateral) gene transfer or recombination. Nodes that represent a reticulation event are duplicated, annotated by introducing the # symbol into the Newick format, and numbered consecutively (using integer values starting with 1).

For example, if leaf Y is the product of hybridisation (x) between lineages leading to C and D in the tree above,    

  

one can express this situation by defining two trees in standard Newick notation  
 (A,B,((C,Y)c,D)e)f; and (A,B,(C,(Y,D)d)e)f;  standard Newick, all nodes are named (internal nodes lowercase, leaves upper case)                      
or in extended Newick notation
 (A,B,((C,(Y)x#H1)c,(x#H1,D)d)e)f;               extended Newick, all nodes are named; 1 is the integer identifying the hybrid node x

The  here is a hybrid node. It will be joined by the program into a single node when drawn.
This is the picture drawn by Dendroscope for this example:
 

The production rules above is modified by the following for labelling hybrid nodes (in general, nodes representing reticulation events):

 Leaf → Name Hybrid
 Hybrid → empty | "#" Type integer  -- The #i part is an obligatory identifier for a hybrid node
 Type → empty | string              -- type of reticulation, e.g., H = hybridisation, LGT = lateral gene transfer, R = recombination.

In the visualization of LGT events, for a given reticulate node, one incoming edge is usually drawn as an "acceptor" edge and all other incoming edges are drawn as "transfer" edges. Some programs (e.g.

Extended Newick is backward-compatible: a hybrid node would simply be interpreted as a few strangely-named nodes for legacy parsers.

Rich Newick format 
The Rich Newick format, also known as the Rice Newick format, is a further extension of Extended Newick. It adds support for:
 Unrooted phylogenies. This is simply done by writing an unrooted tree as usual (i.e., pick an arbitrary root at a binary branch point) and prefixing  to the string. , on the other hand, can be used to force a rooted tree.
 Bootstrap values and probabilities. This is done by adding additional  fields after the length; fields can be left empty as long as the colons are present. This may be backward-incompatible.

Ad hoc extensions 
 MrBayes and BEAST add additional information like probability, length in years, standard deviation for values to the nodes. They also use .

Visualization 

Many tools have been published to visualize Newick tree data. Specific examples include the ETE toolkit ("Environment for Tree Exploration") and T-REX. Phylogenetic software packages such as SplitsTree and the tree-viewer Dendroscope as well as the online tree viewing tool IcyTree can handle standard and extended Newick notation, while the phylogenetic network software PhyloNet makes use of both the Extended Newick and Rich Newick format.

See also 
phyloXML
T-REX (Webserver) allows handling phylogenetic trees and networks in the Newick format.
Smart Game Format is an application of Newick format and is widely used for recording board games.

References

External links
Miyamoto and Goodman's Phylogram of Eutherian Mammals An example of a large phylogram with its Newick format representation.
Phylogenetic tree (newick) viewer (By Huerta-Cepas et al. 2016)

Trees (data structures)
Graph description languages
Phylogenetics